The Washoe County School District (WCSD) is a public school district providing public education to students in all parts of Washoe County, Nevada, including the cities of Reno and Sparks, and the unincorporated communities of Verdi, Incline Village, Sun Valley and Gerlach. The Washoe County School District is the second largest school district in Nevada with approximately 64,000 students enrolled in 96 schools.

A board of seven elected trustees governs the Washoe County School District. The current president of the WCSD Board of Trustees is Katy Simon Holland. The trustees appoint a superintendent to lead the district in day-to-day operations.

Superintendent
Superintendent Dr. Susan Enfield leads the Washoe County School District.

The Superintendent, as Chief Executive Officer, oversees the day-to-day activities of the District. Dr. Enfield provides support to the School Board and the Washoe County School District by managing the Strategic Plan in accordance with established goals.

Dr. Seng-Dao Yang Keo is the district's Deputy Superintendent.

Schools 
The WCSD currently has 66 elementary schools, a special education school, 16 middle schools, 13 comprehensive high schools, Truckee Meadows Community College High School, Innovations High School (a comprehensive high school of choice), Gerlach K-12, and the Academy of Arts, Careers and Technology.

In the WCSD, elementary schools typically include kindergarten through fifth grade, middle schools include sixth grade through eighth grade, and high schools include ninth grade through twelfth grade. The WCSD is currently working to move sixth grade students to middle school and anticipates doing so as soon as three planned new middle schools are constructed.

K-12 schools
 Gerlach K-12 School (consolidation of Gerlach High School and Ernest M. Johnson Elementary School)

High schools

 Damonte Ranch High School
 Galena High School
 Hug High School
 Incline High School
 Robert McQueen High School
 North Valleys High School
 Reno High School 
 Edward C. Reed High School
 Spanish Springs High School
 Sparks High School
 Earl Wooster High School
 Academy of Arts, Careers and Technology
 Coral Academy of Science High School
 Innovations High School
 TMCC Magnet High School
 North Star Online School
 Academy of Career Education Charter School

K-8 schools
 Mount Rose K-8 School

Middle schools

 B.D. Billinghurst Middle School
 Clayton Middle School
 Cold Springs Middle School
 Depoali Middle School
 Dilworth STEM Academy
 Marce Herz Middle School
 Incline Middle School
 Mendive Middle School
 O'Brien STEM Academy
 Pine Middle School
 Yvonne Shaw Middle School
 Sparks Middle School
 Darrel C. Swope Middle School
 Fred W. Traner Middle School
 Vaughn Middle School
 Desert Skies Middle School
 Sky Ranch Middle School

Elementary-schools

 Lois Allen
 Anderson
 Bud Beasley
 Jesse Beck
 Esther Bennett
 John Bohach
 Libby C. Booth
 Brown
 Rita Cannan
 Caughlin Ranch
 Roger Corbett
 Desert Heights
 Lloyd Diedrichsen
 Edwin Dodson
 Donner Springs
 Double Diamond
 Florence Drake
 Glenn Duncan STEM
 Katherine Dunn
 Elmcrest
 Nancy Gomes
 Roy Gomm
 Grace Warner
 Greenbrae
 Hidden Valley
 Huffaker
 Ted Hunsberger
 Hunter Lake
 Jesse Hall
 Incline
 Michael Inskeep
 Lena Juniper
 Lemelson STEM
 Lemmon Valley
 Elizabeth Lenz
 Lincoln Park
 Echo Loder
 Bernice Mathews
 Alice Maxwell
 Rollan Melton
 Robert Mitchell
 Marvin Moss
 Natchez
 Virginia Palmer
 Peavine
 Marvin Picollo Special Education School
 Pleasant Valley
 Nick Poulakidas
 JWood Raw
 Agnes Risley
 Miguel Sepulveda 
 Silver Lake
 Alice Smith
 Kate Smith
 Smithridge STEM
 Spanish Springs
 Stead
 Sun Valley
 Alyce Taylor
 Mamie Towles
 Edward Van Gorder
 Verdi
 Veterans Memorial STEM
 Westergard
 Jerry Whitehead
 Sarah Winnemucca

Circa 2000 Natchez, in Wadsworth, had about 160 students with 94% being Native American. Enrollment remained at the same level as of 2016. The school is on the Paiute Indian Reservation and is the only school in the district that is on a Native American reservation. Holly O'Driscoll of the Nevada Living Magazine described it as "a small, older" facility. In 2017 Siobhan McAndrew of the Reno Gazette Journal stated that historically Natchez had issues with academic performance but by 2017 had a new principal and newly-hired teachers. The district extensively renovated the school in summer 2017, spending $1.5 million to do so.

2013 shooting

A student opened fire at Sparks Middle School, a Washoe County School District school. Two students were critically injured, and a teacher was fatally shot while trying to intervene with the student. The gunman then committed suicide by shooting himself. Students from the school were evacuated and were placed at Sparks High School, where they held until they were picked up by their guardians.

References

External links 
 http://www.washoe.k12.nv.us/community/press-releases/2011-09-14/graduation-rate-improves-for-second-year-in-a-row
http://washoecountyschools.org/community/office-of-superintendent/superintendent
 Washoe County School District
 http://www.washoe.k12.nv.us/community/press-releases/2011-09-14/graduation-rate-improves-for-second-year-in-a-row

 
School districts in Nevada
Education in Washoe County, Nevada